Wong Chuk Shan New Village is a village in Sai Kung District, Hong Kong.

Nearby villages include Mau Ping New Village, Pak Kong and Pak Kong Au.

Administration
Wong Chuk Shan New Village is a recognized village under the New Territories Small House Policy.

References

External links

 Delineation of area of existing village Pak Kong Au (Sai Kung) for election of resident representative (2019 to 2022)

Villages in Sai Kung District, Hong Kong